Sergei Leonidovich Dorensky (3 December 1931 – 26 February 2020) was a Russian pianist.

He was trained under Grigory Ginsburg at the Moscow Conservatory. Dorensky was awarded a gold medal at the 5th World Festival of Youth and Students and the 1957 Rio de Janeiro Competition's 2nd prize, which allowed him to perform throughout Western Europe and America.

That same year he was appointed a teacher at the Moscow Conservatory, where he held a professorship from 1978 until 1997. He has taught many wonderful pianists, which include Nikolai Lugansky, Denis Matsuev, Alexander Shtarkman, Olga Kern, Feodor Amirov, Andrei Pisarev and Ramzi Yassa.
He served on the jury of the Paloma O'Shea Santander International Piano Competition in 1978, 1980, 1982, 1984 and 1992. He was named a People's Artist of Russia in 1989, and was decorated with the Order of Friendship eight years later. He was the Russian Fryderyk Chopin and Sergey Rachmaninov Societies' vice-president.

References

External links
 Cincinnati's World Piano Competition
 Viotti Competition
 Moscow Conservatory
 

Moscow Conservatory alumni
Academic staff of Moscow Conservatory
People's Artists of Russia
Soviet classical pianists
Russian classical pianists
Male classical pianists
1931 births
2020 deaths
20th-century classical pianists
21st-century classical pianists
Recipients of the Order "For Merit to the Fatherland", 3rd class
Honored Artists of the RSFSR
Musicians from Moscow
20th-century Russian male musicians
21st-century Russian male musicians